Parawaous megacephalus is a species of fish in the subfamily, Gobionellinae, and the only member of the monotypic genus Parawaous. It is endemic to Borneo, where it occurs in freshwater habitat. It grows to a length of  SL.

References

Gobionellinae
Monotypic fish genera
Endemic fauna of Borneo
Fish described in 1905